Katarzyna Kołodziejczyk (born 7 April 1998) is a Polish sprint canoeist.

Career
She participated at the 2018 ICF Canoe Sprint World Championships, winning a bronze medal.

References

External links

Living people
1998 births
Polish female canoeists
ICF Canoe Sprint World Championships medalists in kayak
Canoeists at the 2019 European Games
European Games medalists in canoeing
European Games bronze medalists for Poland
Sportspeople from Kalisz
21st-century Polish women
20th-century Polish women